Şener Özmen (born 1971, Idil) is a Kurdish artist.

Early life 
He graduated from the Department of Painting Education at the Faculty of Education at Çukurova University.

Career 
He began as an artist, drawing comics and writing poetry. His poetry was published in Düşün, Mavi Çizgi and the Islık amongst others. Later he worked in contemporary art. 

He had solo exhibitions and his art was included in group exhibitions in several countries. His art was shown in exhibitions in the Centre Pompidou and the documenta 13 and he won the Prix Meuly in Thun, Switzerland. 

He wrote articles concerning art exhibitions that were published in Birgün newspaper, Sanat Dünyamız and Siyahî. 

His artwork includes videos, sculptures and paintings and often has a focus on Kurdish culture and the Kurdish question. He is an author of fiction and has translated Kurdish literature into English.

Books 
Eskiden Ne Güzeldi(Once How Beautiful It Was),Liman Editions, 1999
Şaşıracaksın(You Will Be Amazed),Liman Editions, 1999
Ağıt mı bu yaktığın?(Is That a Dirge You Sing?),Liman Editions, 1999
Sözüm Haritadan Dışarı(Saving Your Map),Lîs Editions, 2004
Rojnivîska Spinoza (The Diary of Spinoza), Lîs Editions, 2008
The Epic of Kawa and Azhî Dehaq, 2011
My Heart is a Pillow for Love, 2012
Pêşbaziya Çîrokên Neqediyayî(The Bout of the Incompetent Stories), Lîs Editions, 2010
Gramera Bêhizûr (The Restless Grammar), Lîs Editions, 2014

References 

Living people
1971 births
Kurdish male artists